Mikhail Franzevich Kerzelli (c. 1740 [or 1750, or 1755] – December 1818) was a pianist, violinist, teacher and composer of string quartets, violin duets, orchestral and liturgical compositions.

Kerzelli was born at Vienna.  There are some operas attributed to him:
Derevensky prazdnik ili Uvenchannaja dobrodetel (Деревенский праздник, или Увенчанная добродетель – The Village Feast or Crowned Virtue, opera in 3 acts, text by Vasily Maikov, 1777 Moscow) 
Finiks (Финикс – Phoenix,  text by Nikolai Nikolev), opera in 3 acts (1779 Moscow)
Arkas i Irisa (Аркас и Ириса – Arkas and Irisa, text by  Vasily Maikov), one-act opera, c. 1780, Moscow) 
Plenira i Zelim (Пленира и Зелим – Plenira and Zelim, opera in 3 acts (1789 Moscow) (probably belongs to Ivan Kerzelli)
He died in Moscow.

References 

Russian opera composers
Male opera composers
Russian male classical composers
Russian conductors (music)
Russian male conductors (music)
1740s births
1818 deaths
Mikhail